The 2006 Triple J Hottest 100 was announced on Australia Day, 26 January 2007.  It is the fourteenth such countdown of the most popular songs of the year, as voted by listeners of the Australian radio station Triple J.

Voting began on 1 January 2007, and closed on 21 January.  671,024 votes were counted in this year's poll.

The broadcast began at 10 a.m., and at midday, crossed to Hyde Park in Sydney for a live broadcast of the countdown, beginning at #75.  The top 10 was announced from 6 p.m. by breakfast team Myf Warhurst and Jay and the Doctor. The broadcast was also the first time the Hottest 100 had a live video webcast through the Triple J Website, showing film clips of each video and live footage from Hyde Park.

Full list 
Note: Australian artists 

67 different artists' songs were included in the list. 42 of the 100 tracks were by Australian artists.

Artists with multiple entries

Five entries:
 Hilltop Hoods (3, 23, 41, 56, 77)

Four entries:
 The Grates (10, 17, 42, 71)
 Lily Allen (15, 35, 92, 93)

Three entries:

 Arctic Monkeys (30, 49, 89)
 Placebo (25, 59, 78)

Two entries:

 AFI (46, 67)
 The Butterfly Effect (32, 39)
 Bob Evans (36, 37)
 Eskimo Joe (2, 95)
 Gnarls Barkley (6, 81)
 Gotye (8, 94)
 Jet (72, 76)
 Josh Pyke (38, 57)
 The Killers (4, 31)
 Lupe Fiasco (19, 86)
 Muse (9, 18)
 Pendulum (82, 88)
 Regina Spektor (20, 48)
 Sarah Blasko (58, 79)
 Snow Patrol (7, 74)
 The Strokes (27, 50)
 Tool (22, 29)
 Wolfmother (55, 80)
 Yeah Yeah Yeahs (24, 66)

Countries represented
Australia – 42
United States – 34
United Kingdom – 20
France – 2
Canada – 1
Sweden – 1

This was the first countdown since 1999 to feature an all-Australian top 3.

Top 10 Albums of 2006
Bold indicates winner of the Hottest 100 in 2006 and 2007. Hilltop Hoods won the J Award for The Hard Road.

CD Release

Notes
 The Living End, with their song Wake Up at #53, made it into the countdown for the tenth year in a row.
 Augie March become the first band to get the #1 spot and have no other songs featured in the top 100 since Spiderbait in 1996.

References

External links
Triple J Hottest 100

2006 in Australian music
Australia Triple J Hottest 100
2006